Kayaköy (also: Kaya) is a village in the Kemalpaşa District, Artvin Province, Turkey. Its population is 464 (2021).

History 
According to list of villages in Laz language book (2009), name of the village is Shana, which means "dowery" in Laz and Mingrelian language. Most villagers are ethnically Hemshin.

References

Villages in Kemalpaşa District